The yellow-faced siskin (Spinus yarrellii) is a species of finch in the family Fringillidae.
It is found in Brazil and Venezuela.

Its natural habitats are subtropical or tropical moist mountains, subtropical or tropical dry shrubland, arable land, plantations, and urban areas.

The binomial of this bird commemorates the English ornithologist William Yarrell.

Phylogeny
It has been obtained by Antonio Arnaiz-Villena et al.

References

 Clement, Peter; Harris, Alan & Davis, John (1993): Finches and Sparrows: an identification guide. Christopher Helm, London. 

yellow-faced siskin
Birds of the Caatinga
Endemic birds of Brazil
yellow-faced siskin
Taxonomy articles created by Polbot
yellow-faced siskin